Lauren Tesoriero (born 10 September 1986) is a retired Australian rules footballer who played for the Richmond Football Club in the AFL Women's competition (AFLW).

Early life and state-league football
Tesoriero grew up in the Melbourne suburb of Mount Evelyn, learning to play football in the backyard with her brothers. She helped out at the Mount Evelyn Football Club with activities like boundary umpiring and running water, but didn't play since her parents didn't allow her. A family friend convinced her parents to play the last two games of the season with the under-10 boys and they were the only games they won that season. Due to lack of girl's youth teams in football, Tesoriero started playing basketball and netball. She represented the Mount Evelyn Netball Club and later played for the North East Blaze in the Victorian Netball League.

In 2005, at the age of 18, Tesoriero started playing senior football at Yarra Valley Cougars. A year later she was selected to represent the Victorian state football team. She was also a member of the Australia women's international rules football team that played against Ireland in the 2006 Ladies' International Rules Series.

She then joined VFLW club Eastern Devils. In 2012 she suffered an ACL tear while training with the Devils, but continued to play on the damaged knee for the rest of the year without surgery, instead resting the injury for three months before returning and then another six months before having surgery to fully repair the injury. In 2016 she averaged a goal per game for the club.

While still playing state-league football and following her ACL injury, Tesoriero started coaching netball, including for two years at Yea and a year at Mansfield.

Tesoriero has also played football outside of Australia, representing Wandsworth Demons in the AFL London competition.

AFL Women's career

Collingwood (2017–2018)
Tesoriero was selected by Collingwood with pick 107, and she described it as a "second wind", after considering retiring. She made her debut in round 1, 2017, in the inaugural AFLW match at Ikon Park against Carlton.

Collingwood re-signed Tesoriero for the 2018 season during the trade period in May 2017.

In June 2018, Tesoriero was delisted by Collingwood.

Following her delisting, Tesoriero joined Richmond for the 2018 VFL Women's season and began volunteering as a women's recruiter and scout the club. In October 2018 she joined Richmond as a full time AFLW recruiter and accepted a role as a playing assistant coach for the 2019 VFLW season. She suffered an ACL tear in her left knee while playing a match against NT Thunder in June 2019, but opted against a full surgical repair in favour of the quicker non-surgical return she had once before successfully completed while playing state-league football in 2012.

Richmond (2020)
She made her Richmond debut against  at Ikon Park in the opening round of the 2020 season.
She announced her retirement on 25 March 2020.

Statistics
Statistics are correct to the end of the 2020 season.

|- style="background-color: #eaeaea"
! scope="row" style="text-align:center" | 2017
|style="text-align:center;"|
| 7 || 5 || 0 || 1 || 24 || 22 || 46 || 7 || 18 || 0.0 || 0.2 || 4.8 || 4.4 || 9.2 || 1.4 || 3.6
|- 
! scope="row" style="text-align:center" | 2018
|style="text-align:center;"|
| 7 || 6 || 1 || 1 || 22 || 23 || 45 || 13 || 16 || 0.2 || 0.2 || 3.7 || 3.8 || 7.5 || 2.2 || 2.7
|- style="background-color: #EAEAEA"
! scope="row" style="text-align:center" | 2019
| —  || —  || —  || — || — || — || — || — || — || — || — || — || — || — || — || — || —
|-
! scope="row" style="text-align:center" | 2020
|style="text-align:center;"|
| 7 || 4 || 0 || 0 || 9 || 12 || 21 || 3 || 9 || 0.0 || 0.0 || 2.3 || 3.0 || 5.3 || 0.8 || 2.3
|- class="sortbottom"
! colspan=3| Career
! 15
! 1
! 2
! 55
! 57
! 112
! 23
! 43
! 0.1
! 0.1
! 3.7
! 3.8
! 7.5
! 1.5
! 2.9
|}

References

External links

 
 

Living people
1986 births
Collingwood Football Club (AFLW) players
Australian rules footballers from Melbourne
Sportswomen from Victoria (Australia)
Australia women's international rules football team players
Richmond Football Club (AFLW) players
Australian netball players
Victorian Netball League players
Netball players from Melbourne
People from Mount Evelyn, Victoria
Australian netball coaches
Australian expatriate sportspeople in England